Karnal is a city in India.

Karnal may also refer to:

 Karnal district, an Indian district in Haryana state
 Karnal division, an Indian administrative division which includes Karnal district
 Karnal (Lok Sabha constituency), a parliamentary constituency in Karnal district
 Karnal (Vidhan Sabha constituency), one of nine seats in the parliamentary constituency
 Karnal Airport, an airstrip at the Indian city Karnal
 Karnal (instrument), a type of trumpet
 Of the Flesh a 1983 Philippine film called Karnal in Filipino
 Leandro Karnal, (born 1963), a Brazilian philosopher, historian, and university professor

See also
 Carnal